Snail Tower is an apartment building in Tartu, Estonia. The tower resembles a gastropod shell, hence the name "snail tower".

The tower was designed by Vilen Künnapu and Ain Padrik and was opened in 2008. The tower has 23 floors.

References

Buildings and structures in Tartu
Skyscrapers in Estonia